Phan Thanh Hưng (born 14 January 1987) is a Vietnamese footballer who plays as a central midfielder for V.League 2 club Cần Thơ and the Vietnam national football team.

International goals

Achievements

Club
Quảng Nam
 V.League 1: 2017

References 

1987 births
Living people
Vietnamese footballers
Association football midfielders
V.League 1 players
SHB Da Nang FC players
Quang Nam FC players
Vietnam international footballers
Footballers at the 2010 Asian Games
People from Da Nang
Southeast Asian Games silver medalists for Vietnam
Southeast Asian Games medalists in football
Competitors at the 2009 Southeast Asian Games
Asian Games competitors for Vietnam